Jacob Jones is the name of:

Jacob Jones (basketball), American basketball player
Jacob Jones (footballer), Welsh footballer
Jacob Jones (naval officer), American naval officer

See also
Jake Jones (disambiguation)